Events in the year 1985 in Greece.

Incumbents

Events

 June 14 – TWA Flight 847 was hijacked by two Hezbollah terrorists after departing from Ellinikon International Airport in Athens. The Boeing 727-200 was carrying 145 passengers and crew to Rome, Italy.

Births
31 January – Kalomira, Greek-American singer, in West Hempstead, New York, United States
18 March – Charikleia Pantazi, rhythmic gymnast

Deaths

References

 
Years of the 20th century in Greece
Greece
1980s in Greece
Greece